AIV may refer to:

Aimco, NYSE symbol AIV, an American operator of apartment communities
AIV fodder, a kind of acidified silage
Bavarian A IV, an 1852 German steam locomotive model
George Downer Airport (IATA: AIV) serving Aliceville, Alabama, USA
Panoz AIV Roadster, an American automobile
Angiotensin IV  (angiotensin 4)